Puerres is a town and municipality in the Nariño Department, Colombia.

Climate
Puerres has a comfortable subtropical highland climate (Köppen Cfb) with moderate rainfall year-round.

References

External links
  - cultural information from the municipality of Puerres.

Municipalities of Nariño Department